CNA Center may refer to one of the following buildings that has housed the headquarters of CNA Financial Corporation:

 151 North Franklin, called CNA Center starting in 2018
 333 South Wabash, called CNA Center until 2018

See also
 List of tallest buildings in Chicago